Iestyn Davies  (born 16 September 1979) is a British classical countertenor.

Education and background
Davies was born in York, England and first studied piano and recorder, mentored in his early years by his father Ioan, the founding cellist of the Fitzwilliam Quartet. From the age of eight he sang as a boy treble in the choir of St John's College, Cambridge. He began singing countertenor in his teens, at Wells Cathedral School. He returned to St John's as a choral scholar, graduating in Archaeology and Anthropology. He gained his DipRAM from, and was later appointed ARAM by, the Royal Academy of Music. In 2004 he won the Audience Prize at the London Handel Singing Competition and in 2010 was named "Young Artist of the Year" by the Royal Philharmonic Society.

Davies' father Ioan was a long-standing cellist with the Fitzwilliam Quartet and a member of St. John's College.

Performance
Davies's opera career to date has included the role of Ottone in Monteverdi's L'incoronazione di Poppea for both Zürich Opera 
 and Glyndebourne Festival Opera, and in Handel's Partenope he has sung Arsace for New York City Opera 
 and Armindo for English National Opera. He has sung Oberon in Britten's A Midsummer Night's Dream for Houston Grand Opera, Apollo in Britten's Death in Venice for English National Opera and Hamor in Handel's Jephtha for both Welsh National Opera and Opéra National de Bordeaux. In 2010 he sang Creonte in Agostino Steffani's Niobe at the Royal Opera House, Covent Garden. In 2011, he sang the part of Unulfo in Handel's Rodelinda at the Metropolitan Opera in New York. He returned to the Met in 2020 in another Handel opera, Agrippina, in which he sang the role of Ottone.

He has appeared in concert at Teatro alla Scala with Gustavo Dudamel, at the Concertgebouw and the Tonhalle with Ton Koopman, at the Barbican, the Théâtre des Champs-Élysées and Lincoln Center, and at the Royal Albert Hall in the BBC Proms. He has worked with many leading orchestras including the Orchestra of the Age of Enlightenment, Academy of Ancient Music, Scottish Chamber Orchestra, the Hallé Orchestra, the King's Consort, Northern Sinfonia, the English Concert, the Akademie für Alte Musik, Berlin, Retrospect Ensemble, the Parley of Instruments, Il Complesso Barocco, the Gabrieli Consort and Players, the Minnesota Orchestra, London Philharmonic Orchestra, Britten Sinfonia, Concerto Köln, Concerto Copenhagen, Ensemble Matheus, Fretwork and the Bournemouth Symphony Orchestra.

Leading interpreters with whom Davies has collaborated include conductors Rinaldo Alessandrini, Philippe Bender, Harry Bicket, Ivor Bolton, Frans Brüggen, Harry Christophers, Stephen Cleobury, Laurence Cummings, Christian Curnyn, Alan Curtis, Steven Devine, Richard Egarr, John Eliot Gardiner, Edward Gardner, Jane Glover, Paul Goodwin, Emmanuelle Haïm, Matthew Halls, Nikolas Harnoncourt, Edward Higginbottom, David Hill, Benedict Hoffnung, Christopher Hogwood, Peter Holman, Robert King, Nicholas Kraemer, Stephen Layton, Iain Leddingham, Charles Mackerras, Paul McCreesh, Kenneth Montgomery, Lars Ulrik Mortensen, Kent Nagano, Donald Nally, James O'Donnell, Enrico Onofri, Daniel Reuss, Jeffrey Skidmore, Jean-Christophe Spinosi, Charles Stewart, Patrick Summers, Elizabeth Wallfisch, Alison Balsom and Dominic Wheeler, and recitalists Julius Drake, Mark Padmore, Philip Langridge and Roger Vignoles.

Davies was the guest soloist in Leonard Bernstein's 'Chichester Psalms' at the Last Night of the Proms at the Royal Albert Hall in September 2013.

He sang his first full operatic performance for La Scala in Death in Venice. In London, he sang the role of Oberon in A Midsummer Night's Dream at English National Opera.

Beginning in December 2017, he performed the singing voice of Farinelli in Farinelli and the King at the Belasco Theatre on Broadway. The production ran for 16 weeks and featured Mark Rylance as King Philippe V of Spain. Davies is reprising the role he played at Shakespeare's Globe and in London's West End.

In April 2021 Davies sang with English National Opera in a social distanced performance of Handel's Messiah, staged at the London Coliseum and conducted from the harpsichord by Laurence Cummings, broadcast by BBC Two.

In February 2022, Davies sang in a performance of Bach's Mass in B minor with the Philharmonia Baroque Orchestra under the direction of Richard Egarr.

Honours
Davies was made a Fellow of the Royal Academy of Music in 2012.

He was appointed Member of the Order of the British Empire (MBE) in the 2017 New Year Honours for services to music.

Recordings
Davies has an extensive and growing discography including a Wigmore Live CD (2010) of a 2009 recital with his own Ensemble Guadagni and three recordings as a treble chorister.

Reviews
The Guardian (2010)
 Time Out (2010)
The New York Times (2010)
The Independent (2009)
Press clippings

References

External links

Askonas Holt artist management
Wigmore Hall podcast: Iestyn Davies in conversation
New York City Opera podcast: Iestyn Davies and Anthony Roth Costanzo discuss the countertenor voice
Iestyn Davies sings Vivaldi
"Iestyn Davies: the accidental counter-tenor" at The Daily Telegraph, 2009
"Yet can I hear that dulcet lay", by George Frideric Handel at youtube.com

Living people
1979 births
People from York
Operatic countertenors
British performers of early music
Alumni of St John's College, Cambridge
Fellows of the Royal Academy of Music
British child singers
People educated at Wells Cathedral School
Members of the Order of the British Empire
21st-century English singers
21st-century British opera singers
21st-century British male singers